Borovsky District is an administrative and municipal district (raion), one of the twenty-four in Kaluga Oblast, Russia. It is located in the north of the oblast. Its administrative center is the town of Borovsk. Population:   54,661 (2002 Census);  The population of Borovsk accounts for 16.6% of the district's total population.

References

Notes

Sources

Districts of Kaluga Oblast

